Cosmochilus falcifer is a species of cyprinid in the genus Cosmochilus. It inhabits Indonesia and Malaysia.

References

Cyprinidae
Fish of Indonesia
Fish of Malaysia